Today's Business is an American business news television program that aired on CNBC in the early morning, 5–7 am ET timeslot, hosted for the end of its run by Liz Claman and Bob Sellers. In January 2002, New York Post mentions producers are taking away this programme with expanded hour. Finally, it was replaced by Wake Up Call on Feb 4, 2002.  The show covered news that was expect to affect the stock market trading day ahead and overnight business news in Asia. It listed as CNBC’s second most-watched program.

Today's Business anchors
Felicia Taylor and Susie Gharib (1994(?)-1998(?))
Bob Sellers and Bonnie Behrand (Today's Business: Early Edition, 1999)
Tom Costello and Sydnie Kohara (1999)
Bob Sellers and Liz Claman (2000–2002)

Today's Business: Early Edition
In 1999, Today's Business: Early Edition was added on weekdays from 5–6 am ET on CNBC. It was hosted by Bob Sellers and Bonnie Behrand, which expanded the whole Today's Business block to 3 hours.

Today's Business: Early Edition provided frequent round-ups of key business and general news stories, along with sports updates. Regular segments included "Wake Up with Jay", highlights from Jay Leno's Tonight Show monologue, and live weather reports from Chief Meteorologist Joe Witte.

CNBC Europe edition

A business news television program also titled Today's Business aired on CNBC Europe from 6–7 am CET (5–6 am WET) between January 2001 and March 2007. It was originally based on the CNBC U.S. morning version of Today's Business.

The European Today's Business was presented by Steve Sedgwick from 2006 through the end of the program's run in 2007. Earlier presenters of the program were Simon Hobbs (2001–2003), Serena Al-Awa (2003), and Guy Johnson (2003–2006). The executive producer of morning programming is Harry Fuller.

Segments on the program included a review of the previous day's business, a news headlines round-up, as well as early results from the market. The program also linked up with CNBC Asia for continuing coverage of the Asian session.

The program was renamed from Today's Business Europe in May 2003. While the title was only slightly altered, the program was reduced from two hours to one (with the then-titled CNBC Europe Squawk Box gaining an hour). While Today's Business Europe had been presented in front of CNBC Europe's video wall, the new program, initially co-anchored by Guy Johnson and Serena Al-Awa, was presented from behind a desk.

The program ended its run on March 23, 2007 and was replaced on March 26, 2007 by a new show, Capital Connection, co-anchored by Maura Fogarty at CNBC Asia in Singapore and Sedgwick in London.

Worldwide Today's Business
Around CNBC's global branches, there are many counterparts of Today's Business in the world:

References

External links
Today's Business official website (Internet Archive)
Today's Business Europe official website (Internet Archive)

1994 American television series debuts
2002 American television series endings
1990s American television talk shows
2000s American television talk shows
1990s American television news shows
2000s American television news shows
CNBC original programming
Business-related television series